Xubida relovae is a moth in the family Crambidae. It was described by Alexander Barrett Klots in 1970. It has been recorded from the US states of Florida and Louisiana.

References

Haimbachiini
Moths described in 1970